Friedrich Weidemann (1 January 187130 January 1919) was a German baritone who was a leading singer at the Vienna Court Opera from 1903 until his death.

Biography
Weidemann was born in Ratzeburg in 1871.

He created the role of Kaspar in Alexander von Zemlinsky's opera Es war einmal on 22 January 1900, alongside Selma Kurz, under Gustav Mahler's baton. He came to the Vienna Court Opera in 1903, where he worked with Karl Weigl as vocal coach.

He sang in a new production of Wagner's Das Rheingold on 23 January 1905, under Mahler.

Six days later, on 29 January, he was the soloist in the premiere of Mahler's Kindertotenlieder. This concert also included the premiere performance of "Der Tamboursg'sell" from Des Knaben Wunderhorn.

His other roles at the Court Opera included the title role in Mozart's Don Giovanni (December 1905), and Wotan in Die Walküre (1907, alongside Anna von Mildenburg).

On one occasion Bruno Walter engaged Weidemann for a performance of Mahler's Das Lied von der Erde using tenor and baritone. Mahler had died in 1911 having never heard the work. He had specified on the score that the singers could be either tenor and contralto or tenor and baritone. However, Walter felt that tenor and baritone did not work as well as tenor and contralto, and he did not repeat the experiment.

Weidemann died in Vienna in 1919 at age 48.

Recordings
Weidemann's voice can be heard in:
 "O Mimì, tu più non torni" from Puccini's La bohème, with Leo Slezak (1905)
 "Wotans Abschied" from Die Walküre
 "Du lässt mich kalt von hinnen scheiden", from Lortzing's Der Waffenschmied
 Highlights from Goldmark's The Queen of Sheba
 "Auf wolkigen Höhen" from Wagner's  Siegfried
 "Wer Corneval's Ehr" from Tristan und Isolde
 "Auf Gesellen" from Lortzing's Zar und Zimmermann (Tsar and Carpenter)
 Sextet from Donizetti's Lucia di Lammermoor
 "Ach lass dein Vaterherz" from Halévy's La Juive.

References

External links

1871 births
1919 deaths
People from Ratzeburg
German operatic baritones
19th-century German male opera singers